Guamo ( Wamo or Guamotey) is an extinct language of Venezuela. Kaufman (1990) finds a connection with the Chapacuran languages convincing.

Varieties
Varieties that may have been dialects or closely related languages:

Guamo of San José - on the Santo Domingo River, Zamora
Dazaro - once spoken in Zamora on the Guanare River
Guamontey - once spoken from the mouth of the Zárate River to the Apure River (unattested)
Tayaga - once spoken between the Arauca River and Apure River, in Apure State (unattested)
Atapaima - once spoken at the mouth of the Guanaparo River, Guárico State, Venezuela (unattested)
Guárico - extinct principal language Guárico State, once spoken on the Guárico River, Portuguesa River, and Apure River (unattested)
Guire - once spoken on the middle course of the Tiznados River, Orituco River, and Guaritico River, Guarico State (unattested)
Payme - once spoken at the mouth of the Guárico River (unattested)

Dialect comparison
Loukotka (1968) lists the following basic vocabulary items for the Santa Rosa and San José dialects of Guamo.

{| class="wikitable sortable"
! gloss !! Santa Rosa !! San José
|-
! one
| tagstar || tagstame
|-
! two
| kete || dikiampa
|-
! three
| kurumktin || kakute
|-
! head
| putí || puté
|-
! eye
| tuxua || tuagin
|-
! tooth
| aufé || ufé
|-
! man
| daixu || dauirko
|-
! water
| kum || kum
|-
! fire
| kuxul || 
|-
! sun
| tign || matatin
|-
! jaguar
| dion || dion
|-
! house
| danga || danxa
|}

1778 word list
Guama is primarily attested in a word list from 1778. The list has been reproduced below, with the original Spanish orthography maintained for the Guama forms.

References

Bibliography

 

Indigenous languages of the South American Northeast
Languages of Venezuela
Extinct languages of South America
Language isolates of South America